The 1994–95 Boston University Terriers men's ice hockey team represented Boston University in college ice hockey. In its 22nd year under head coach Jack Parker the team compiled a 31–6–3 record and reached the NCAA tournament for the sixth consecutive season and twenty first all-time. The Terriers defeated Maine 6–2 in the championship game at the Providence Civic Center in Providence, Rhode Island, to win their fourth national championship.

Season
Coming off of the worst championship loss in over 30 years, Jack Parker was looking for a way to help his team recover from a nightmarish end. To make matters worse, goaltender J. P. McKersie an AHCA Second Team All-American, was hit by a car while biking that left him in a coma for 6 days. While McKersie would recover and eventually continue his playing career, he would sit out the entire 1994–95 season. This left a rather large void in net, but because Parker rotated his goaltenders, senior alternate captain Derek Herlofsky was well positioned to shoulder his share of the burden. The bulk of McKersie's minutes would eventuallo go to Chicago draft pick Tom Noble who beat out Shawn Ferullo for the second spot in goal.

The forward and defensive corps were in a much more stable position as BU returned the majority of its principle players from a year before. The Terriers also added a couple of top prospects to this mix, including Chris Drury who was already nationally famous for having led Trumbull, Connecticut, to the 1989 Little League World Series championship.

Slow start
Early on, the Terriers had trouble finding consistency in their game, starting 3–1–2 through the first three weeks of the season but having allowed 7 goals against in two different games. After a weekend against the worst team in Hockey East Massachusetts, albeit only in their second season since returning to the ice, BU was able to settle down and get themselves ready for their first tournament of the season.

Tournament play
At the end of November BU headed to California for the Great Western Freeze–Out, held at the home arena of the Los Angeles Kings. The Terriers easily downed Princeton in the semifinal then pushed national powerhouse Maine into overtime but the Black Bears were the ones who prevailed. While the loss didn't harm BU too much since it was a non-conference game, they faced Maine in a pair of road games the following weekend. While the Terriers could only capture 3 points out of 10 in the series, both games were played very close and demonstrated that the two teams were evenly matched.

The near miss against Maine appeared to light a fire under the Terriers who utterly dominated their next two games (winning by a combined score of 21–3) before taking several weeks off for their winter break. When the team returned to the ice at the end of December they did so in Minneapolis for the Mariucci Classic. Similar to their first tournament, BU won the semifinal comfortably and headed into overtime in the title game. This time they were able to win from a goal by Ken Rausch.
63 58

Catching Maine
At the beginning of 1995 BU was 16 points behind Maine, however, because Hockey East had altered its point system beginning with 1994–95 (5 points for a win, 2 points for a tie and an additional point for a shootout win after overtime) they were only about 3 games behind the Black Bears with 3 games in hand. This meant that despite going 0–1–2 against Maine in their head-to-head matchups the Terriers could still keep even with the conference leaders as long as they took care of business.

The Terriers played well in January going 6–2, with all games coming against conference opponents. The consistent play allowed BU to close the gap with Maine with one game in hand. That would be put on the back-burner, however, as BU played in the Beanpot at the beginning of February. The Terriers were able to capture their 18th title after dropping a weak Boston College team in the championship, but the time off had allowed Maine to build a 15-point lead in the Hockey East standings.

Ill-equipped to afford a mistake the Terriers laid an egg in against Providence, losing 1–8 in their worst performance of the season. BU recovered to win the rematch but that left Maine with a 10-point lead in the standings and both teams had three games to play. Fortunately for the Terriers their remaining games came against two of the worst teams in Hockey East while the Black Bears faced much stiffer competition. BU swept their final three games while Maine lost twice and the two teams ended in a tie for 1st in the conference standings.

Hockey East tournament
Because Maine had the tie-breaker due to the head-to-head meetings, BU received the 2nd seed and played Merrimack in the quarterfinals. While the game was close, BU won the 1-goal game and advanced to the semifinal at the nearby Boston Garden. The Terriers took care of Massachusetts–Lowell to reach the championship where they were surprised to find 6th-seeded Providence as their opponent. The Friars proved up to the task and played the Terriers hard but BU held firm and won the game 3–2 to win their second consecutive conference tournament.

NCAA tournament
The championship allowed BU to earn the top eastern seed and a bye into the regional semifinals. After a week off the Terriers faced defending national champion Lake Superior State and were able to exact their revenge with a 6–2 victory. BU advanced to the Frozen Four and faced Minnesota in a rematch of the 1994 national semifinal. The score may have been different but the result was the same as Boston University defeated the Golden Gophers 7–3 to return to the national championship game.

The Terriers faced Maine on April Fools Day and though the Black Bears had yet to lose to BU that year they were coming off of a 3 overtime epic against Michigan (then the longest game in NCAA tournament history). Despite this Maine was able to control the balance of play early, outshooting the Terriers early but on a faceoff in the Black Bear end on the Power Play, Steve Thornton was able to tap the puck through Brad Purdie's skates and fire home the first goal of the game. After that Maine netminder Blair Allison had to face a barrage by the BU offense that saw him face 21 shots over the next 25 minutes (compared to Maine's 6). The Terriers would score twice more to build a 3-goal lead midway through the game but the Black Bears were able to get on the scoresheet before the end of the second. Maine closed the lead to one just 31 seconds into the final frame but BU continued to apply pressure to Allison and scored twice more before capping off the game with a third power play goal to win their fourth national championship.

Awards and honors
The two-goal game from Chris O'Sullivan earned him the Tournament MOP and was joined on the All-Tournament team by Kaj Linna and Shawn Bates. Mike Grier was named to the AHCA All-American East First Team while Linna and O'Sullivan made the second team. All three players were named to the All-Hockey East Second Team while Chris Kelleher made the Hockey East All-Rookie Team. Steve Thornton received the Len Ceglarski Award for sportsmanship.

Standings

Schedule

|-
!colspan=12 style=";" | Exhibition

|-
!colspan=12 style=";" | Regular Season

|-
!colspan=12 style=";" | 

|-
!colspan=12 style=";" | 

|-
!colspan=12 style=";" | 

|-
!colspan=12 style=";" | 

|-
!colspan=12 style=";" |

Roster

Scoring Statistics

Goaltending statistics

1995 championship game

(E1) Boston University vs. (E2) Maine

Players drafted into the NHL

1995 NHL Entry Draft

References

Boston University Terriers men's ice hockey seasons
Boston University
Boston University
Boston University
Boston University
Boston University
Boston University
Boston University
Boston University